Las Coloradas may refer to:
 Las Coloradas, Argentina, settlement in Argentina
 Las Coloradas, Yucatán, settlement in Mexico